Tyunikovo is a rural locality (a selo) in Velikoarkhangelskoye Rural Settlement, Buturlinovsky District, Voronezh Oblast, Russia. The population was 128 as of 2010. There are 4 streets.

Geography 
Tyunikovo is located 20 km northeast of Buturlinovka (the district's administrative centre) by road. Velikoarkhangelskoye is the nearest rural locality.

References 

Rural localities in Buturlinovsky District